Albert Scanes (6 August 1900 – 1 November 1969) was an Australian cricketer. He played ten first-class matches for New South Wales between 1921/22 and 1927/28.

See also
 List of New South Wales representative cricketers

References

External links
 

1900 births
1969 deaths
Australian cricketers
New South Wales cricketers
Cricketers from Sydney